Hattons Model Railways is a British retailer and manufacturer of model railway paraphernalia founded in Liverpool, England in 1946 by Norman Hatton (1918-2005).

After significant growth due to a move into online mail order the company relocated to Widnes, Cheshire in January 2016 and is still part owned by Norman Hatton's daughter Christine Hatton.

Early Years 
After leaving the army in 1946, Norman Hatton opened a shop at 142 Smithdown Road  in Liverpool. His idea was to sell things that people found hard to get after the war. He sold bric 'n' brac, fireworks, household items such as firewood and almost anything he could find, including gas masks. He discovered that model locomotives and toys were his best selling items and he began to focus his attention on purchasing as much stock of these as he could, mainly driving around Liverpool looking for second hand stock to sell on and by the 1950s Hattons was on its way to becoming a fully fledged model shop.

1950s - 1990s 

By 1958 Norman realised that he needed bigger premises. He remained on Smithdown Road and moved into number 180 that year. It was around this time that Meccano wanted to offload a large quantity of stock and they sold the lot to Hattons for a fraction of what they were worth with Norman being quoted in a 2001 interview as saying some items took 20 years to sell out due to the amount he had purchased.

Norman placed extensive adverts in the model railway press and the company grew throughout the 1960s, 1970s and the 1980s with the help of mail order customers from all over the world sending Norman regular business.

In 1999 Hattons launched their first website, a directory of the items that they had for sale to make it easier for people wanting to place orders via post or over the telephone to view the entire stock in one place. The same year number 182 Smithdown Road was purchased and the store expanded into both buildings.

Norman semi retired in 1998 leaving the running of the business to his two children Keith (1959–2008) and Christine Hatton.

2000s - present day 

Despite only having expanded the building in 1999, by 2001 the business was relocated further along Smithdown Road to number 364 - 368, which better suited the ever-expanding stock levels.

2002 saw the launch of the eHattons website, which allowed customers to order directly online for the first time.

Norman Hatton died in 2005 aged 87. By the time of his death, Hattons was turning over £1 million per year. His son Keith also passed away during a holiday in Ibiza in 2008. He was just 49. Following the deaths of her father and brother, Christine Hatton took over the running of the company along with present managing director Richard Davies. As of 2018, the company was turning over £17 million a year.

The early 2010s saw Hattons move the majority of their stock to a warehouse in Widnes, Cheshire, known as the Hattons Hub and in January 2016, after 70 years, the store on Smithdown Road was closed for the final time, with all operations moving to the Widnes site on Montague Road. The explanation for this was the expansion of the company's online business meant that having stock split over two sites was no longer viable, the Smithdown Road building needing to be brought up to modern standards and the lack of parking outside the store for customers was prohibitive.

The building on Smithdown Road was turned into a Leaf tearoom in September 2019. One of their tables is made from the Hattons signage.

Manufacturing 

Hattons started to push manufacturing their own products exclusively in 2018, under their Hattons Originals sub-brand. Before this, they had mainly designed products and then relied on third-party manufacturers such as Heljan and Dapol to produce them. Some Heljan products included the Beyer Garratt and Class 14 locomotives.

2018 saw the release of the first Hattons self produced products, their P Class and Andrew Barclay Sons & Co. range of locomotives, quickly followed by other self produced models such as a range of 50t Warwell wagons, FEA Intermodal wagons and Rail Head Treatment Trains. In 2019, Hattons released an extensive range of Class 66 locomotives.

In 2021, Hattons are set to release a range of 4 and 6 wheel coaches in OO gauge, representing the trains that would have been commonplace in the Late 19th and early 20th century.

Pre-Owned Model Railways 

Hattons began to buy and sell second hand model railway items, diecast vehicles and plastic kits in 2013. Purchasing pre-owned items became a popular area of the Hattons website and proved to be a successful venture for the business. So much so, that they expanded their operation to include a new sub-brand called Hattons Model Money, which takes the form of a new website where customers can list their items online and receive a free valuation.

Brands and product types 

Hattons currently stocks a vast amount of items and boasts on its website that they have usually over 18,000 items available for sale. Products sold include locomotives, model vehicles and aircraft, scenery, track, tools and paints. Some of the well known brands sold by Hattons include;

 Hornby (Including Airfix, Corgi Toys, Rivarossi)
 Heljan A/S
 Dapol
 Peco
 Oxford Diecast/ Rail
 Gaugemaster (including Kato)
 DCC Concepts

Competitors
Hattons' main competitors are considered to be Rails of Sheffield.  Other model retailers include Cheltenham Model Centre, Kernow Model Rail Centre and Harburn Hobbies.

References

Model railroad manufacturers
Rail transport modelling
Toy retailers of the United Kingdom
Toy train manufacturers
Companies based in Cheshire